Carl Christian Berner (20 November 1841 – 25 May 1918) was a Norwegian politician for the Liberal Party. He was  member of the Council of State Division in Stockholm 1891–92, and Norwegian Minister of Education and Church Affairs 1892–93.

Background
Berner was born in Oslo, Norway. He was the son of Oluf Steen Julius Berner (1809–55) and Marie Louise Falkenberg (1816–41). He  studied science and mathematics before he started working as a teacher at several different schools in Oslo. Berner studied at the  Royal Frederick University  (now University of Oslo) where he earned his  cand.philol. in 1861. In 1874 he was appointed director of the newly established polytechnical school of Bergen; a position he held until 1891.

Political career
In Bergen he started his political career and in 1883 he was elected to the county council. In 1885 he was elected as a member of the Norwegian Parliament. He had a brilliant career in the Parliament, and in his second period he was appointed President of the lower house (Odelsting). As the President of the Odelsting, he was central in the conflict leading to Prime Minister Emil Stangs stepping down from office. In 1891 he stepped up as Minister of Education and Church Affairs under the government of Johannes Steen. Between 1895–03, Berner represented Bergen as a member of Parliament, and between 1903-1909 he represented Sarpsborg. He was appointed President of the Norwegian parliament in 1898—a position he held until 1908. He played an important role in the dissolution of the union between Norway and Sweden in 1905. In 1909, Berner did not get elected to Parliament from the district of Nedre Romerike. He gradually stepped down from his political offices, though he did hold several administrative and representative offices. In 1884 he was a co-founder of the Norwegian Association for Women's Rights.

Personal life
He was married in 1868 to Olivia Mathilde Jacobine Berner (1841-1919). They were the parents of the architects Jørgen Haslef Berner (1873-1955) and Carl Berner (1877-1943).

References

1841 births
1918 deaths
Politicians from Oslo
University of Oslo alumni
Norwegian educators
Government ministers of Norway
Presidents of the Storting
Members of the Storting
Liberal Party (Norway) politicians
Norwegian Association for Women's Rights people
Ministers of Education of Norway